Rico Marais (born 13 October 1964) is a South African cricketer. He played in fifteen first-class and eleven List A matches for Boland from 1988/89 to 1990/91.

See also
 List of Boland representative cricketers

References

External links
 

1964 births
Living people
South African cricketers
Boland cricketers